Baghwala Mohra is a town in the Islamabad Capital Territory of Pakistan. It is located at 33° 25' 25N 73° 20' 25E with an altitude of 536 metres (1761 feet).

References 

Union councils of Islamabad Capital Territory
Villages in Islamabad Capital Territory